La Crevasse is a mountain of the Pennine Alps, overlooking Sembrancher in the canton of Valais. It lies just east of the Col des Planches.

The mountain is mostly wooded, except for its southwestern side, which consists of almost vertical cliffs.

References

External links
 La Crevasse on Hikr

Mountains of the Alps
Mountains of Valais
Mountains of Switzerland
One-thousanders of Switzerland